Hall Morgan Post 83, American Legion Hut, in Rison, Arkansas, also known as Rison American Legion Hut, was built in 1934.  It was listed on the National Register of Historic Places in 2003 and delisted in 2013.

References

Clubhouses on the National Register of Historic Places in Arkansas
Cultural infrastructure completed in 1934
Rustic architecture in Arkansas
American Legion buildings
National Register of Historic Places in Cleveland County, Arkansas
1934 establishments in Arkansas
Former National Register of Historic Places in Arkansas
Works Progress Administration in Arkansas
Civil Works Administration